Sir Ronald Claus Hampel (born 31 May 1932) is an English former businessman, who was chief executive and chairman of ICI in the 1990s. He planned and oversaw the Zeneca de-merger in June 1993.

Early life
He was born in Shropshire, the son of Karl Hampel (29 May 1898 -10 February 1960) and Rutgard Hauck (8 August 1904 - 21 April 1975). His brothers were born in 1934 and 1935. He grew up in Allscott.

He attended Corpus Christi College, Cambridge where he obtained an MA in Modern Languages and Law.

Career
He started at ICI in 1955. He joined the ICI board in 1985.

In the 1990s, ICI was the world's largest manufacturer of paint (after buying Glidden Paints in 1986) and explosives (after buying Atlas Powder Company in 1990).

In February 1991 it had been decided to streamline the company around seven core business areas. Later in 1991 it was realised that there was most synergy around two distinct main core areas. He became chief operating officer on Tuesday 1 October 1991.

On 29 July 1992 it was officially decided to de-merge the business into ICI and another company, possibly to be known as ICI Biosciences. In late November 1992 it had been decided to call the new company Zeneca, under Sir David Barnes (1936-2020). The company was originally to be called Zenica. The main products of Zeneca included Hibitane (Chlorhexidine), the world's best-selling hospital antiseptic since the 1950s. DNA fingerprinting and DNA paternity testing  had been mostly first developed by Cellmark Diagnostics (now called Orchid Cellmark), which became part of Zeneca; to this day it is one of the main UK DNA profiling companies; it was the world's first commercial DNA testing laboratory. For 1991, Zeneca had larger sales than Pfizer.

He became chief executive and deputy-chairman of ICI in 1993. The reformed £2.5bn ICI would largely make paint and explosives. Zeneca would be worth £6bn. Zeneca split in June 1993.

He was appointed chairman in April 1995.
In 1996 he was paid £863,000
 In 1997 ICI bought Unilever's chemical division for £4.8bn. He was chairman until Thursday 22 April 1999, at the annual shareholders meeting, with Friends of the Earth in uninvited attendance.

Corporate governance
In January 1998 he was responsible for the Hampel Report, for corporate governance in the United Kingdom, set up by the Financial Reporting Council in November 1995.

Personal life
He was knighted in the 1995 New Year Honours.

He married in 1957 in Somerset. He has twin sons (born 1962), another son (born 1960) and one daughter (born 1958). He lives in rural West Sussex.

References

1932 births
Alumni of Corpus Christi College, Cambridge
British manufacturing chief executives
Businesspeople awarded knighthoods
Corporate governance in the United Kingdom
Imperial Chemical Industries executives
Knights Bachelor
People from Lodsworth
Living people